The Safran Arrano is a turboshaft engine for two-to-three ton single-engine and four-to-six ton twin-engine helicopters, developed by Safran Helicopter Engines, outputting .

Development

First bench tested in February 2014 in Bordes, Pyrénées-Atlantiques, its thermodynamic core comes from the Clean Sky Tech 800 demonstrator, first tested in April 2013.
It powers the Airbus Helicopters H160 which made its maiden flight in Marignane on 27 January 2016.

By October 2017, it has amassed 4,000h of testing and 700h of flight time, the first production units should be delivered in early 2018 and the H160 should enter service in 2019.
It passed blade-out tests, continued operation with no lubrication, altitude trials in 2016 in Saclay and in 2017 endurance should be tested in all operating conditions for certification.
By October 2018, the programme had accumulated 7,500h, including 1,500h of flight time, certification testing was close to the end and most of the documentation should be submitted by the end of the year.

The turboshaft received its type certificate during the June 2019 Paris Air Show, before EASA approval for the H160 planned for the fourth quarter and first delivery to a US customer for corporate transport in May 2020.

Design
It should reduce brake specific fuel consumption by 10 to 15% compared to previous engines, contribute to increase new helicopters payload-range performance, with reduced size and is designed to facilitate maintenance and repairs.
In cruise, its thermodynamic cycle is improved by variable-pitch Inlet Guide Vane blades above the compressor.
Metal laser sintering is used for serial production of the combustion chambers injectors.

Applications
 Airbus Helicopters H160

Specifications

See also

HAL HTSE-1200

References

External links
 

2010s turboshaft engines
Aneto